The Joey Bishop Show is the title of the following shows which starred American comic actor Joey Bishop:

 The Joey Bishop Show (TV series), an American situation comedy television series, broadcast by NBC (1961–1964) and CBS (1964–1965)
 The Joey Bishop Show (talk show), an American television talk show program, presented on ABC's nighttime schedule (11:30pm–1am) from April 1967 to December 1969